Under a Stone with No Inscription is Anata's third full-length album. It was released by Wicked World Records.

Track listing
"Shackled to Guilt" – 3:48
"A Problem Yet to Be Solved" – 3:47
"Entropy Within" – 4:05
"Dance to the Song of Apathy" - 4:39
"Sewerages of the Mind" - 4:30
"Built on Sand" - 3:20
"Under the Debris" - 5:56
"The Drowning" - 3:56
"Leaving the Spirit Behind" - 3:44
"Any Kind of Magic or Miracle" - 7:06

Personnel
 Fredrik Schälin - Lead vocals, guitar
 Andreas Allenmark - guitar, vocals
 Henrik Drake - bass
 Conny Pettersson - drums

References

2004 albums
Anata (band) albums
Earache Records albums